FC Arbon 05  are a football team from Arbon in Switzerland who played in the 2L Inter Group 5 2008–2009.

Staff and board members

 Goalkeeper Coach:   Matthias Germann
 President:  Ralph Farner

External links
Official Website

Association football clubs established in 1905
Football clubs in Switzerland
Arbon
1905 establishments in Switzerland